The Misfortunes of Sophie (French: Les Malheurs de Sophie) is a 1946 French comedy drama film directed by Jacqueline Audry and starring Madeleine Rousset, Marguerite Moreno and Michel Auclair. The film is based on the novel of the same name by La Comtesse de Ségur.

It was shot at the Victorine Studios in Nice. The film's sets were designed by the art directors Alexandre Trauner and Marcel Magniez.

Cast

References

Bibliography 
 Tim Palmer & Charlie Michael. Directory of World Cinema: France. Intellect Books, 2013.

External links 
 

1946 films
1946 comedy-drama films
French comedy-drama films
1940s French-language films
Films directed by Jacqueline Audry
Films based on French novels
French black-and-white films
Pathé films
Films shot at Victorine Studios
1940s French films